This is a list of the Dutch Top 40 number-one singles of 2011. The Dutch Top 40 is a chart that ranks the best-performing singles of the Netherlands. It is published every week by radio station Radio 538. In 2011, it was the first time that the Dutch Top 40 had 53 releases, because there were 53 Saturdays in 2011. In the past, if there were 53 Saturdays in a year, the Dutch Top 40 was only released 52 times.

Eighteen acts gained their first number-one single in the Dutch Top 40 in 2011, either as lead or featured act: Martin Solveig, Dragonette, Adele, Alexis Jordan, Ne-Yo, Afrojack, Nayer, Sak Noel, Don Omar, Lucenzo, Maroon 5, Christina Aguilera, The Voice of Holland, Gotye, Kimbra, Gers Pardoel, Sandro Silva and Quintino. This means only Lady Gaga and Pitbull did not gain their first number-one single this year: they gained their first number-one singles in 2009 (Gaga with "Just Dance" and Pitbull with "I Know You Want Me (Calle Ocho)").

Lady Gaga's single "Born This Way" debuted at number one in the Top 40 this year. This has not happened since 2009, when Lisa Lois's cover version of "Hallelujah" debuted at number one. Alexis Jordan became the artist with the most weeks on number one this year: her song "Happiness" spent ten weeks at the top (see number-one artists). Three singles spent only one week at the number-one position: "Set Fire to the Rain", "One Thousand Voices" and "Epic".
 
The artist with the most number-one singles in 2011, was Adele. In fact, she was the only artist with more than one number-one single this year. She reached the top with her songs "Rolling in the Deep" and "Set Fire to the Rain". Adele also became, with these two singles, the first act since 1974 that held the number-one position with more than one song consecutively. In 1974, the English band Mud managed to achieve this with the singles "Dynamite" and "Tiger Feet".

Seven artists that scored a Dutch Top 40 number-one single in 2011, are American; five are Dutch. The other artists are Belgian Australian, Canadian, French, New Zealander, Portuguese, Puerto Rican, Spanish and British. The most used language in the number-one singles of 2011 is English.

Chart history

Notes
1 ^ "One Thousand Voices" is a song by the coaches of the Dutch programme The Voice of Holland: Marco Borsato, Angela Groothuizen, Nick & Simon (Nick Schilder & Simon Keizer) and VanVelzen.

Number-one artists

See also
2011 in music

References

Number-one singles
Netherlands Dutch Top 40
2011